Out in the Blue is the twelfth studio album by Australian singer Jimmy Barnes. It was released on 24 November 2007 as both a single-disc and limited double-disc edition. The majority of the songs on the album were written by Barnes, many of them in relation to his recent heart surgery. Neil Finn contributed the track "Blue Hotel" and Kasey Chambers performs a duet on "When Two Hearts Collide". Jim Moginie of Midnight Oil also appears on the album.

Out in the Blue is predominantly a rootsy acoustic rock album, but also contains elements of rockabilly and country.

Track listing

Out in the Blue
 "I Can't Tell You Why" (Jimmy Barnes) – 3:38
 "Out in the Blue" (Jimmy Barnes) – 4:47
 "You From Me" (Jimmy Barnes) – 3:37
 "Blue Hotel" (Neil Finn) – 4:15
 "When Two Hearts Collide" (with Kasey Chambers) (Jimmy Barnes) – 3:49
 "Red Light" (Jimmy Barnes, Nick Barker) – 4:54
 "Everything Is Changing" (Jimmy Barnes, EJ Barnes) – 4:08
 "Better Off Alone" (Jimmy Barnes) – 2:59
 "Water Wash All Over Me" (Jimmy Barnes, Glenn Cunningham, Paul Graham) – 4:22
 "I'm Surprised" (Tex Perkins, Jimmy Barnes, Jackie Barnes) – 2:54
 "Losing You" (Jimmy Barnes) – 3:35
 "Forgiveness" (Jimmy Barnes) – 4:47

Live at the Sydney Opera House: The Max Session (Limited edition bonus CD)
 "Flame Trees" (Steve Prestwich, Don Walker) – 5:50
 "Out in The Blue" (Jimmy Barnes) – 4:58
 "Without Your Love" (Jimmy Barnes, Anthony Carey) – 5:09
 "Never Give Up" (Jimmy Barnes, Jane Barnes, Guy Davies) – 5:12
 "Blue Hotel" (Neil Finn) – 4:49
 "Come Undone" (Jimmy Barnes, Mark Lizotte) – 5:08
 "Four Walls" (Don Walker) – 2:33
 "When Your Love Is Gone" (Jimmy Barnes, Tony Brock, Kevin Savigar) – 5:36

Personnel

Out in the Blue
 Jimmy Barnes – lead vocals, harmony vocals, acoustic guitar
 Jackie Barnes – drums, percussion, piano, Wurlitzer, backing vocals
 Chris Haigh – bass
 Jim Moginie – electric, acoustic, nylon and resonator guitars, keyboards, piano, rhodes, omnichord
 Mark Punch – electric, slide and baritone guitars
 Kasey Chambers – vocals on When Two Hearts Collide

Live at the Sydney Opera House: The Max Session
 Jimmy Barnes – vocals
 Ben Rodgers – acoustic guitar
 Jak Housden – electric guitar
 Lawrie Minson – pedal steel and acoustic guitar
 Dario Bortolin – bass
 Jackie Barnes – drums
 Dave Pritchard – piano
 Mark Lizotte – vocals and guitar on Come Undone
 Mahalia Barnes – backing vocals
EJ Barnes – backing vocals
 Elly May Barnes – backing vocals
Juanita Tippins – backing vocals
Gary Pinto – backing vocals
 Darren Percival – backing vocals

Charts

Year-end charts

Certifications

References

External links
Official Jimmy Barnes website

2007 albums
Jimmy Barnes albums